Nobgan (also Romanized as Nobgān and Nabgan; also known as Nobakān, Now Bagān, and Nowbegān) is a village in Gazin Rural District, Raghiveh District, Haftgel County, Khuzestan Province, Iran. At the 2006 census, its population was 55, in 8 families.

References 

Populated places in Haftkel County